The 1990 Citibank Open was a men's tennis tournament played on outdoor hard courts in Itaparica, Brazil that was part of the World Series category of the 1990 ATP Tour. It was the fifth and last edition of the tournament and took place from 5 November through 11 November 1990. Fifth-seeded Mats Wilander, who entered the draw on a wildcard, won the singles title.

Finals

Singles
 Mats Wilander defeated  Marcelo Filippini 6–1, 6–2
 It was Wilander's 1st singles title of the year and the 33rd and last of his career.

Doubles
 Mauro Menezes /  Fernando Roese defeated  Tomás Carbonell /  Marcos Aurelio Gorriz 7–6, 7–5

References

Citibank Open
Citibank Open
Itaparica